The Parliamentary Under-Secretary of State for Welfare Delivery is a junior position in the Department for Work and Pensions in the British government. It is currently held by David Rutley MP, who took the office on 17 September 2021.

Responsibilities 
The minister has the following responsibilities:

 overall management and delivery of Universal Credit
 support for disadvantaged groups in Universal Credit including care leavers, prison leavers, survivors of domestic abuse, people with drug or alcohol dependency, rough sleepers and those who are facing homelessness
 housing policy and Housing Benefit delivery
 ‘Help to Claim’ service
 poverty
 benefit uprating
 military covenant
 fraud, error and debt

Officeholders

References 

Department for Work and Pensions
Ministerial offices in the United Kingdom
2015 establishments in the United Kingdom